General of the Army Vladimir Yegorovich Pronichev (born 1 March 1953) is a retired Russian security official, and the former head of the Border Guard Service of the Russian Federation. Pronichev also held the title of First Deputy Director of the Federal Security Service (FSB), the successor organization to KGB.

Biography
Born in 1953, Pronichev served with the Border Guards as an officer in the Transcaucasus, the Soviet Far East, and the Northwest Border Districts from 1974 to 1981. Subsequently, he served with the FSB in Karelia and led the FSB's anti-terrorism efforts until 1999, when he was named First Deputy Director in the FSB.

When the Federal Border Guard Service was reorganized (in 2003) as a directorate of the FSB, Pronichev was named to lead the Border Service and retained his former title as well.

Vladimir Pronichev was the head of the FSB operation on the ground in the Beslan school siege and Moscow theater hostage crisis. He served with both the KGB and FSB from 1970 to 2013.

Notes

Sources
 Biography of V.Y. Pronichev, official website of the Border Service of the Russian Federation (in Russian)

External links
 "One More Special Service Created in Russia"(Pravda.ru in English)

Pronichev, Vladimir
Beslan school siege
Soviet border guards
Pronichev, Vladimir
Generals of the army (Russia)
Heroes of the Russian Federation
Frunze Military Academy alumni
People from Melitopol